Hornby Track Master is a software tool to design Hornby Railways train tracks.

Gameplay
Hornby Track-Master is a birds eye 2D Planning tool, distinct from Hornby Virtual Railway (HVR). HVR uses a 3D Planning Environment in which one can plan, build and test a layout. However, being released many years ago, it has fairly low quality graphics. 

Hornby Track-Master, on the other hand, also allows for the development of a shopping list for every thing needed to build a track, but it has no 3D whereas HVR does.

Users select pieces of track from lists and place them where they wish. Track-Master uses birds-eye view to work. Track, platforms, turntables etc. can be added. Once completed the software develops a printable shopping list.

Hornby Track-Master (2011)
Hornby releases the program Track-Master, a 2D planning environment, in 2011. The user can select pieces of track from given lists and place them where desired, using a bird's eye view to work. Platforms, turntables, etc. can also be added. Once the layout is complete, the software develops a printable shopping list.

Notes

References

External links
Hornby Website
Hornby Track-Master
Hornby Virtual Railway

Rail transport modelling